The following list is a discography of production by Clams Casino, an American record producer. It includes a list of songs produced and co-produced by year, artist, album and title.

2009

Lil B - 6 Kiss 
 02. "I'm God"
 16. "I'm the Devil"
 17. "What You Doin'"

2011

A$AP Rocky – Live.Love.Asap 
 01. "Palace"
 03. "Bass"
 04. "Wassup"
 13. "Leaf" (featuring Main Attrakionz)
 15. "Demons"

Lil B – Angels Exodus 
 05. "Motivation"

Lil B – I'm Gay (I'm Happy) 
 04. "Unchain Me"
 12. "1 Time Remix"

Adult Swim Music – Adult Swim Singles Program 2011 
 08. "Wizard" (performed by Clams Casino)

Mac Miller – I Love Life, Thank You 
 07. "Cold Feet"

Mac Miller – Blue Slide Park 
 09. "My Team"
 16. "One Last Thing"

The Weeknd – Echoes of Silence 
 07. "The Fall" (produced with Illangelo)

2012

JJ DOOM - Key to the Kuffs 
 22. "Bookfiend (Clams Casino Version)"

Lil B – God's Father 
 28. "Turned Me Cold"

Mac Miller – Macadelic 
 13. "Angels (When She Shut Her Eyes)"

A$AP Mob – Lords Never Worry 
 13. "Freeze" (featuring ASAP Rocky and Jim Jones)

2013

A$AP Rocky - Long.Live.ASAP 
 04. "LVL"
 05. "Hell" (featuring Santigold)

Mac Miller - Watching Movies with the Sound Off 

 05. "Bird Call"

 16.  "Youforia"

2014

Schoolboy Q – Oxymoron 
 16. "Gravy"

2016

Elle Watson -  Phantom  
 02. “Walls”

2018

Lil Peep – 
 "4 Gold Chains" (featuring Clams Casino)

Elle Watson -  Clinchers  
 04. “Glued”

A$AP Rocky - Testing 
 14. "Black Tux, White Collar"

serpentwithfeet – soil 
 02. "messy" 
04. "fragrant" 
05. "mourning song" 
07. "seedless"

Joji - Ballads 1 

 05. "Can't Get Over You" (featuring Clams Casino)

2019

Jacques Greene - Dawn Chorus 

 02. "Drop Location"

2020

Joji - Nectar 
 10. "Nitrous"

Deftones - Black Stallion 
 01. "Feiticeira (Clams Casino Remix)"

2021

A$AP Rocky - Live.Love.A$AP (Re-release) 

 15. "Sandman"

2022

Flume - Palaces 
 12. "Go" 
 13. "Palaces" (featuring Damon Albarn)

Earl Sweatshirt 

 "Making The Band"

J-Hope - Jack in the Box 

 04. "Stop"
 10. "Arson"

References 

Production discographies